Emmanuel Asante is a Ghanaian academic, theologian and priest. He served as the third Presiding Bishop of the Methodist Church Ghana from 2009 to 2015. He is the chairman of the Ghana Peace Council.

In 2022, United Nations Secretary-General António Guterres appointed Asante to the ten-member Advisory Group of the United Nations Peacebuilding Fund for a term of two years.

References

Living people
Ghanaian theologians
Academic staff of Kwame Nkrumah University of Science and Technology
Ghanaian Methodists
Year of birth missing (living people)